Dhak Bahiri is a cave in the Sahyadri hill range, situated near the village Jambhivli off village-Malavali in the Pune district of India. It was used by pilgrims and sages for the pilgrimage to the god Bahiri.

Location
The nearest col to the cave sits at the end of a 1-hour hike along a trail leading out of Jambhivli. From there, the terrain rises into the Dhak and Kalakrai peak. Reaching the cave requires ascending the col and walking along the scarp, followed by a 30' vertical ascent.

Inside the cave
Water from the rock face drains into a cistern in the cave. There is room inside for 15 - 20 people to camp overnight. The local village maintains a supply of utensils and cookware on hand for use by campers.

Gallery

References

External links
TripAdvisor

Caves of Maharashtra
Forts in Pune district
Tourist attractions in Pune district
Indian rock-cut architecture
Former populated places in India
Hiking trails in India

Hiking